ESL One Katowice 2015, also known as Katowice 2015, was the fifth Counter-Strike: Global Offensive Major Championship, held from March 12 to March 15, 2015, at the Spodek Arena in Katowice, Poland. It was the first CS:GO Major of 2015. It was organized by Electronic Sports League with sponsorship from Valve. The tournament had a total prize pool of US$250,000. The defending champion was Team EnVyUs, whose roster had won the previous Major as Team LDLC.com.

Eight teams advanced from the group stage to a playoff bracket, earning "Legends" status and automatic qualification to the following Major. Fnatic, Team EnVyUs, Ninjas in Pyjamas, Virtus.pro, Natus Vincere, PENTA Sports, and Team SoloMid were returning Legends from the previous Major. Keyd Stars was the only new Legends and became the first South American team to play in a Major and qualify to the playoff bracket. HellRaisers lost its Legends status after losing to Counter Logic Gaming and Keyd Stars in the group stage. The grand finals featured two Swedish teams. Fnatic defeated PENTA Sports and Virtus.pro in the bracket while Ninjas in Pyjamas defeated Team SoloMid and Team EnVyUs on their way to the grand finals. Fnatic then beat Ninjas in Pyjamas 2–1 in the finals. Fnatic became the first team to win a second Major, and remained the only team to do so until MIBR (attending Katowice 2015 as Keyd Stars) won MLG Columbus 2016 and ESL One Cologne 2016.

Format
The top eight teams from DreamHack Winter 2014 ("Legends") received direct invitations to Katowice. In addition, eight other teams (the "Challengers") emerged from offline qualifiers.

Teams were split up into four groups, and all group matches were best-of-ones. The highest seed would play the lowest seed in each group and the second and third seeds would play against each other. The winner of those two matches would play each other to determine which team moved on to the playoff stage, while the losers of the first round of matches also played. The loser of the lower match was then eliminated from the tournament. With one team advanced and one eliminated, the two remaining teams would play an elimination match for the second playoff spot. This format is known as the GSL format, named for the Global StarCraft II League.

The playoffs bracket consisted of eight teams, two from each group. All of these matches were best-of-three, single elimination. Teams advanced in the bracket until a winner was decided.

Map Pool
The seven-map pool did not change from DreamHack Winter 2014. Before each match in the group stage, both teams banned two maps. The map for the match was then randomly selected from the remaining three maps. In the playoffs, each team first banned one map, then chose one map. The two chosen maps were the first two maps in the best-of-three. If the series were to require a third map, the map was randomly selected from the three remaining maps.

Main qualifier
The 16 teams at the main qualifier were separated into two groups of 8. The teams played in a double-elimination, best of one bracket. Four teams from each group, two from the winner's bracket and two from the loser's bracket, advanced to the Major.

Group A

Group B

Broadcast Talent
Hosts
 Sean Charles
 Alex "Machine" Richardson

Analysts
 Casper "cadiaN" Møller
 Spencer "Hiko" Martin

Commentators
 Leigh "Deman" Smith
 Anders Blume
 Lauren "Pansy" Scott
 Stuart "TosspoT" Saw

Observers
 Joshua "steel" Nissan
 Yanko "YNk" Paunović

Teams

Group stage

Group A

Group B

Group C

Group D

Playoffs
The winner of each group played the runner-up of a different group for each quarterfinals match.

Bracket

Quarterfinals

Fnatic vs. PENTA Sports
Casters: Deman & SPUNJ

Virtus.pro vs. Keyd Stars
Casters: TosspoT & seang@res

Team EnVyUs vs. Natus Vincere
Casters: Pansy & natu

Ninjas in Pyjamas vs. Team SoloMid
Casters: Anders Blume & natu

Semifinals

Fnatic vs. Virtus.pro
Casters: Anders Blume & SEMPHIS

Team EnVyUs vs. Ninjas in Pyjamas
Casters: Deman & seang@res

Finals
Both teams in the final had at one point been considered the best team in the world, and the head-to-head was split right down the middle, with Fnatic having a 16–15 lead. 

Casters: Anders Blume, TossopT, & seang@res

Final standings

References

External links
 Official webpage

2015 in Polish sport
2015 in esports
Sports competitions in Katowice
Counter-Strike: Global Offensive Majors
ESL One Counter-Strike competitions
March 2015 sports events in Europe
21st century in Katowice